Nicholas Marthinus van Rensburg (born 24 August 1966) is a South African professional golfer who currently plays on the Sunshine Tour. He has won on the Sunshine Tour six times between 1989 and 2005. He has three Asian Tour victories also.

Van Rensburg was born in Alberton, Gauteng, South Africa. He turned professional in 1987. He won his first Sunshine Tour event in 1989 and has played consistently on tour ever since. He currently resides in Pretoria with his wife Elmarie and his children Kristoff and Carmen.

Amateur highlights
 Colours for Eastern Transvaal and Transvaal
 Highveld Open
 Eastern Transvaal Closed Championship
 Springs Amateur Championship

Professional wins (9)

Asian Tour wins (3)

Asian Tour playoff record (1–1)

Sunshine Tour wins (6)
1989 Highveld Classic
1993 Royal Swazi Sun Classic
1994 Winter Tour Championship
1999 Vodacom Series: Gauteng
2000 Vodacom Series: Gauteng
2005 FNB Botswana Open

External links

South African male golfers
Sunshine Tour golfers
Asian Tour golfers
People from Alberton, Gauteng
Sportspeople from Pretoria
Sportspeople from Gauteng
1966 births
Living people